Gdańsk Niedźwiednik railway station is a railway station serving the city of Gdańsk, in the Pomeranian Voivodeship, Poland. The station opened on 1 September 2015 and is located on the Gdańsk Wrzeszcz–Gdańsk Osowa railway. The train services are operated by SKM Tricity as part of the Pomorska Kolej Metropolitalna (PKM).

Train services
The station is served by the following services:

Pomorska Kolej Metropolitalna services (R) Gdynia Główna — Gdańsk Osowa — Gdańsk Port Lotniczy (Airport) — Gdańsk Wrzeszcz
Pomorska Kolej Metropolitalna services (R) Kartuzy — Gdańsk Port Lotniczy (Airport) — Gdańsk Główny

Public transport
Bus stop Trawki (N/Ż) is located close to the station. The following services call here:

136, 184, 283, N6

References 

 This article is based upon a translation of the Polish language version as of November 2016.

External links

Railway stations in Poland opened in 2015
Niedzwiednik